Stanley Worme (26 October 1887 – 1942) was a Barbadian cricketer. He played in tenfirst-class matches for the Barbados cricket team from 1908 to 1913.

See also
 List of Barbadian representative cricketers

References

External links
 

1887 births
1942 deaths
Barbadian cricketers
Barbados cricketers
People from Saint Philip, Barbados